The Norwegian Ski Federation is headquartered in Oslo, Norway and is the national representative of the International Ski Federation.

Founded on 21 February 1908, it covers the skiing disciplines of alpine, cross-country, freestyle, Nordic combined, ski jumping, and snowboarding. The organization is also involved in the promotion of skiing in Norway, cooperating with the Association for the Promotion of Skiing.

The current president is Tove Moe Dyrhaug, and vice president is Aage Schaanning.

See also
 Norway national alpine ski team

References

External links
 

Norway
Ski
Ski
Ski
Skiing organizations

Organisations based in Oslo
Sports organizations established in 1908